The Quinebaug River is a river in south-central Massachusetts and eastern Connecticut, with watershed extending into western Rhode Island. The river is one of the namesake rivers in the Quinebaug and Shetucket Rivers Valley National Heritage Corridor.

Course
It originates from East Brimfield Lake and ponds northwest of Sturbridge, Massachusetts, flows generally southeast and south through Connecticut (Putnam, Danielson, Plainfield, Canterbury and Jewett City), the river joins Aspinook pond which begins in Canterbury and ends in Jewett City. The river then continues to the Shetucket River northeast of Norwich. That river flows from there into the Thames River and drains into the Long Island Sound. It is dammed in its upper reaches at East Brimfield Dam, Westville Dam, and West Thompson Lake all for flood control, as well as numerous mill dams which powered mills along the river's course. Some of these still provide hydroelectric power today.

Watershed
It is heavily forested with 29 named streams including six major tributaries (the French, Moosup and Five Mile Rivers, and the Wales, Mill and Cady brooks). The watershed is home to fish species including trout, smallmouth bass, largemouth bass, northern pike, and panfish.

Crossings

Paddling the river
Three sections of the Quinebaug River have been designated National Recreation Trails by the National Park Service, some of the first water trails to receive this designation. The sections are:  Holland Pond to East Brimfield Reservoir (in Holland and Brimfield, Massachusetts), Paper Mill Dam in Dudley to West Thompson Lake, and Simonzi Park in Putnam to Aspinook Pond in Canterbury. The East Coast Greenway runs along the river in some spots.

Canoe/kayak launch sites are located at the following locations:
Pond Bridge Road, Holland
US Route 20 boat ramp, Brimfield
Old Mashapaug Road, Sturbridge
West Dudley Road, Dudley
Fabyan Road, Thompson
West Thompson Lake boat ramp, Thompson
Simonzi Park on Kennedy Drive, Putnam
Route 101, Pomfret
Riverside Park off Day Street, Brooklyn
Town Park off Route 12, Killingly
Quinebaug Trout Hatchery, Plainfield
Robert Manship Park off Route 14, Canterbury
Butts Bridge Road, Canterbury

Gallery

See also

List of rivers of Connecticut
List of rivers of Massachusetts

References

External links
 Quinebaug Watershed Profile from the Environmental Protection Agency
 French and Quinebaug Rivers Watershed - profile and documents from the Massachusetts Department of Environmental Protection

Rivers of Hampden County, Massachusetts
Rivers of Worcester County, Massachusetts
Rivers of New London County, Connecticut
Rivers of Windham County, Connecticut
Rivers of Tolland County, Connecticut
Rivers of Massachusetts
Rivers of Connecticut
Connecticut placenames of Native American origin
Massachusetts placenames of Native American origin
Tributaries of the Thames River (Connecticut)